The 2008 Bahrain GP2 Asia Series round was a GP2 Asia Series motor race held on 5 and 6 April 2008 at Bahrain International Circuit in Sakhir, Bahrain. It was the fourth round of the 2008 GP2 Asia Series. The race supported the 2008 Bahrain Grand Prix.

Classification

Qualifying

Feature race

Sprint race

Standings after the event 

Drivers' Championship standings

Teams' Championship standings

 Note: Only the top five positions are included for both sets of standings.

See also 
 2008 Bahrain Grand Prix
 2008 Bahrain Speedcar Series round

References

GP2 Asia Series
GP2 Asia